Gregory Williams (born August 1, 1959) is a former American football safety in the National Football League (NFL) for the Washington Redskins.  He played college football at Mississippi State University.

Early life
Williams was born in Greenville, Mississippi, where he attended and high school football at Greenville Christian School.  He then attended and played college football at Mississippi Delta Junior College, before transferring to Mississippi State University in 1979.

Professional career
Williams was signed by the Washington Redskins in 1982 and won Super Bowl XVII with the Redskins that same year.

References

External links
 

1959 births
Living people
Sportspeople from Greenville, Mississippi
American football safeties
Washington Redskins players
Mississippi State Bulldogs football players
Mississippi Delta Trojans football players